Viničné is a village and municipality in western Slovakia in  Pezinok District in the Bratislava region.

The village is known for archery. In 2006, Viničné held the 6th World University Archery Championship.

References

External links

 Official website
Archery club homepage
http://www.statistics.sk/mosmis/eng/run.html

Villages and municipalities in Pezinok District